Issandr El Amrani is a Moroccan-American political analyst, journalist and commentator who writes about Egypt and the Middle East for British, American and Middle Eastern publications.

El Amrani was born in Rabat, Morocco, and has lived in Cairo since 2000. He was an editor of the now defunct Cairo Times and co-founder of Cairo magazine. From 2007 to 2009 he was the North Africa analyst for the International Crisis Group, an independent non-profit organization that works to prevent, manage, and resolve deadly conflict. He was the Cairo correspondent for Middle East International (MEI), and writes for The Economist, the Financial Times, the London Review of Books, Foreign Policy, The National, Bidoun and other publications. He writes a weekly column for Al-Masry Al-Youm, an independent Egyptian newspaper. He also regularly appears as a commentator on Middle Eastern affairs on television, notably on Al-Jazeera English, and conducts private consulting on the politics of the Middle East.

He is transitioning to Amman, where he and Ursula Lindsey, his wife, are residing with their son Milo.

References

External links
The Arabist blog

Appearances on Democracy Now!
Column archive at The Daily Beast
Column archives at The Daily Star
Column archive at The Guardian
Column archive at London Review of Books
Column archive at Middle East Research and Information Project
Column archive at RFI English
Articles at Journalisted

Ten must-read blogs from the Middle East, Catriona Davies, CNN, 20 April 2011

Living people
Writers from Rabat
American male journalists
Moroccan emigrants to the United States
Year of birth missing (living people)